David Bruckner (born c. 1977) is an American film director. With Jacob Gentry and Dan Bush, he co-wrote and co-directed the 2007 horror film The Signal. Bruckner also co-wrote and directed the "Amateur Night" segment of the 2012 horror anthology film V/H/S, as well as directed the 2017 film The Ritual and the 2020 film The Night House.

Early history 
Bruckner grew up in Atlanta, Georgia.  His father is a police detective and his mother an emergency room nurse.  He attended the University of Georgia along with A. J. Bowen and Jacob Gentry.  The three would later collaborate with Dan Bush on The Signal (2007).

Career 
With Jacob Gentry and Dan Bush, Bruckner co-wrote and co-directed The Signal.  The filmmakers used their connections in Atlanta to compose a crew.  The concept came from a Surrealist game called exquisite corpse, in which multiple people collaborate in order to complete an art project.  When Gentry was unable to contribute to the horror anthology V/H/S (2012), he suggested Bruckner, who eventually co-wrote and directed the segment "Amateur Night".  Also released in 2012, his short film Talk Show addresses the torture debate in mainstream media.  Bruckner was set to direct a reboot of Friday the 13th for Paramount Pictures but was reported to have left in late 2015.  His film Southbound premiered at the 2015  Toronto International Film Festival and was picked up for distribution by the Orchard for release in 2016.  In 2016, he was an executive producer on Siren, which was based on his V/H/S  segment "Amateur Night". In 2017, he released his first solo directed feature, The Ritual, based on the horror novel by Adam Nevill. The film premiered at the Toronto Film Festival, and was released by Netflix. He also directed and produced the horror-thriller The Night House, starring Rebecca Hall. Theatrically released on August 20, 2021, the film was acclaimed by critics. His latest film was a reboot of Hellraiser., starring Jamie Clayton as the lead Cenobite Pinhead.

Awards and nominations 
In 2008, Bruckner was nominated for the Independent Spirit John Cassavetes Award along with Gentry and Bush for The Signal.

Filmography

References

External links 
 

Living people
American film directors
Horror film directors
Year of birth missing (living people)